The Hilda and Gustav Pabst House is a Neoclassical mansion completed in 1907. The home was built for real estate developer and heir to the Pabst Brewing Company Gustav Pabst. The home is located in Milwaukee, Wisconsin in the North Point South Historic District. The home was completed in 1907, and was listed in the Wisconsin state register January 1, 1989 and added to the National Register September 4, 1979 as part of the North Point South Historic District.

History
The Neoclassic mansion was built by Gustav Pabst 1906-07 for $70,000. In 2021 dollars the home would be $2,037,201.06.

Architectural elements
The home features carved limestone and hammered copper detailing. The four pillars that adorn the entryway were carved from a single block of stone.

See also
National Register of Historic Places listings in Milwaukee, Wisconsin

References

External links
Landmark hunter

Historic sites in Wisconsin
Residential buildings on the National Register of Historic Places in Wisconsin
National Register of Historic Places in Milwaukee
1907 establishments in Wisconsin
Historic American Buildings Survey in Wisconsin
1900s architecture in the United States
Houses completed in 1907